Hele-Shaw flow is defined as Stokes flow between two parallel flat plates separated by an infinitesimally small gap, named after Henry Selby Hele-Shaw, who studied the problem in 1898. Various problems in fluid mechanics can be approximated to Hele-Shaw flows and thus the research of these flows is of importance. Approximation to Hele-Shaw flow is specifically important to micro-flows. This is due to manufacturing techniques, which creates shallow planar configurations, and the typically low Reynolds numbers of micro-flows.

The governing equation of Hele-Shaw flows is identical to that of the inviscid potential flow and to the flow of fluid through a porous medium (Darcy's law). It thus permits visualization of this kind of flow in two dimensions.

Mathematical formulation of Hele-Shaw flows

Let ,  be the directions parallel to the flat plates, and  the perpendicular direction, with  being the gap between the plates (at ).
When the gap between plates is asymptotically small
 

the velocity profile in the  direction is parabolic (i.e. is a quadratic function of the coordinate in this direction). The equation relating the pressure gradient to the horizontal velocity  is,

 is the local pressure,  is the fluid viscosity. While the velocity magnitude  varies in the  direction, the velocity-vector direction  is independent of  direction, that is to say, streamline patterns at each level are similar. Eliminating pressure in the above equation, one obtains

where  is the vorticity in the  direction. The streamline patterns thus correspond to potential flow (irrotational flow). Unlike potential flow, here the circulation  around any closed contour , whether it encloses a solid object or not, is zero,

where the last integral is set to zero because  is a single-valued function and the integration is done over a closed contour. 

Integrating over  the continuity we obtain the governing equation of Hele-Shaw flows, the Laplace Equation:
 

This equation is supplemented by the no-penetration boundary conditions on the side walls of the geometry,
 

where  is a unit vector perpendicular to the side wall.

Hele-Shaw cell
The term Hele-Shaw cell is commonly used for cases in which a fluid is injected into the shallow geometry from above or below the geometry, and when the fluid is bounded by another liquid or gas. For such flows the boundary conditions are defined by pressures and surface tensions.

See also 
 Diffusion-limited aggregation
 Lubrication theory
 Thin-film equation
 Hele-Shaw clutch
 A mechanical transmission clutch invented by Prof. Hele-Shaw, using the principles of a Hele-Shaw flow

References

Fluid dynamics